Pradyumna Kumar Mahanandia (born 1949) is an Indian-born Swedish artist famous for his journey by a second hand bicycle from New Delhi to Gothenburg in 1977 to meet the love of his life, Charlotte Von Schedvin.

Early life and education
Mahanandia was born in 1949 in an Odia-speaking weaver family in the village of Kandhapada of the Athmallik sub-division in the district of Angul. He attended Mahendra High School, Athmallik and later joined Visva-Bharati to study art. Despite his admittance to the art school, it became impossible for him to pay for tuition, so he had to return home. He later joined Government College of Art and Crafts, Khallikote and moved to College of Art, Delhi in 1971.

Portraiture and meeting Von Schedvin
While studying in Delhi College of Art, he shot to fame in portraiture by drawing the portrait of Indira Gandhi. He sought permission from the authorities to sit under the holy fountain at Connaught Place and draw portraits.  It is here that he met Von Schedvin on 17 December 1975. She was a student in London who had driven all the way to India in a van for 22 days and went to visit PK to have her portrait done. That portrait changed their lives as they fell in love with each other and married. Von Schedvin had to return to Sweden and asked Pradyumna to come with her, but he decided that one day he would go on his own.
After she left, the two kept in touch through letters.

Recognition
Mahanandia is well known in Sweden as an artist and works as an adviser of art and culture for the Swedish government. His paintings have been exhibited in major cities of the world and have found places in the prestigious UNICEF greeting cards. On 4 January 2012, he was awarded an honorary doctorate degree (Degree of Honoris Causa) from Utkal University of Culture (UUC) in Bhubaneshwar, Odisha. He was also designated as the Odia Cultural ambassador to Sweden by the Government of Odisha. In 2010, Indian filmmaker Sanjay Leela Bhansali was planning to make a film on the love story of Mahanandia and Von Schedvin.

References

1949 births
Living people
People from Odisha
Swedish people of Indian descent